The Golden Boys is a romantic comedy, set on Cape Cod in 1905, about three 70-year-old retired sea captains who try to lure an attractive middle-aged woman into marriage.  Developed under the working title Chatham, the film is an adaptation of the Joseph Lincoln novel Cap’n Eri and was released by Roadside Attractions on April 17, 2009.

Plot
A romantic comedy, set on Cape Cod in 1905, about three 70-year-old retired sea captains who try to lure an attractive, middle-aged woman into marriage.

Cast
 David Carradine as Captain Zebulon "Zeb" Hedge
 Rip Torn as Captain Jeremiah "Jerry" Burgess
 Bruce Dern as Captain Perez Ryder
 Mariel Hemingway as Martha Snow
 Charles Durning as John Bartlett
 John Savage as Web Saunders
 Angelica Torn as Melissa Busteed
 Christy Scott Cashman as Elizabeth Preston
 Jason Alan Smith as Ralph Hazeltine
 Julie Harris as Melodeon player
 Roger Dillingham Jr. as Townsmen
 Lila Dupree as Pasha Norris
 Jonathan Edwards as Reverend Perly
 Donald Foley as Bluey Batchelder
 Joseph Guglielmo as US Life Saving Service (uncredited)
 Peter Jordan as Ezekial
 Lauri Kriva as Townsperson
 Stephen Russell as Luther Norris
 Mike Williams as Captain Clapp

Production
The film, adapted and directed by Daniel Adams, stars David Carradine, Rip Torn, Bruce Dern, Mariel Hemingway, Angelica Torn, Christy Scott Cashman, Charles Durning, Julie Harris (without dialog, as a melodeon player in one scene), Stephen Russell, and singer-songwriter Jonathan Edwards, who also scored the film.

Two of Norman Mailer's sons are attached to the film: Michael Mailer is one of the producers, and his younger brother Stephen Mailer plays one of two local ne'er-do-wells, along with actor Donald Foley.

The original cast was to have included Martin Landau, Burt Reynolds, Dennis Hopper, Anne Archer, and Peter Boyle, according to Adams.

According to the Boston Herald, filming was done on location in Osterville, Massachusetts in March 2007. Other locations included West Barnstable, Chatham, Provincetown, Yarmouthport, Orleans, and Hyannis, Massachusetts.

The production designer was David Allen, the costumer Deborah Newhall, and the casting director Carolyn Pickman.

References

External links
 
 Cap'n Eri book online

2008 films
2008 romantic comedy films
American romantic comedy films
Films about old age
Films directed by Daniel Adams (director)
Roadside Attractions films
Films set in Massachusetts
Films shot in Massachusetts
Films based on American novels
Films set in 1905
2000s English-language films
2000s American films